ICDC  may refer to:

 ICDC College, a for-profit career college with four campuses in Southern California
 Industrial and Commercial Development Corporation, a company owned by the Kenyan government
 International Committee for Democracy in Cuba, a human rights organization
 Iraqi Civil Defense Corps